Charles Kinsey (1773June 25, 1849) was a U.S. Representative from New Jersey from 1820 to 1821.

Early life and career
Kinsey was born in Baltimore, Maryland in 1773. He attended the common schools, and in early life engaged in the manufacture of paper. He moved to Bloomfield Township, Essex County, New Jersey and later to Paterson, New Jersey and New Prospect (now Waldwick), Bergen County, continuing in the paper industry.

In 1807 he invented a machine which allowed paper to be produced in one continuous roll. His correspondence with James Madison is in the Library of Congress.

Political career
Kinsey was a member of New Jersey General Assembly in 1812, 1813, 1819, and 1826 and served in the New Jersey Legislative Council (now the New Jersey Senate) in 1814. He was elected as a Democratic-Republican to the 15th Congress (March 4, 1817 - March 3, 1819), then elected to the 16th Congress to fill the vacancy caused by the resignation of John Condit and served from February 2, 1820 to March 3, 1821.

Later career and death
After serving in the Congress, Kinsey continued to work in the paper industry. He then became a judge, serving as judge of the New Jersey Court of Common Pleas and of the orphans’ court of Bergen County, New Jersey from 1830 to 1845.

He died in New Prospect, New Jersey on June 25, 1849 and is buried in Union Cemetery, near New Prospect.

References

External links

1773 births
1849 deaths
Members of the New Jersey General Assembly
Members of the New Jersey Legislative Council
Papermakers
Politicians from Baltimore
People from Bloomfield, New Jersey
People from Waldwick, New Jersey
American judges
Democratic-Republican Party members of the United States House of Representatives from New Jersey